Andrew Smith (1 September 1889 – 18 May 1983) was an Australian cricketer. He played twelve first-class matches for South Australia between 1913/14 and 1921/22. He was a slow bowler for West Torrens in district cricket.

See also
 List of South Australian representative cricketers

References

External links
 

1889 births
1983 deaths
Australian cricketers
South Australia cricketers